Viktor Lindgren (born March 16, 1986, in Luleå, Sweden) is a professional Swedish ice hockey player. He is currently playing for Graz 99ers and formerly for EC Red Bull Salzburg,  Luleå HF in Elitserien.

References

External links

1986 births
Living people
Luleå HF players
People from Luleå
Swedish ice hockey right wingers
Sportspeople from Norrbotten County